Under the Influence is the eighth studio album by American country music artist Alan Jackson. It was released on October 26, 1999, and features covers of other country artists' material. Three singles were released from Under the Influence; "Pop a Top", "The Blues Man", and "It Must Be Love", which respectively reached No. 6, No. 37, and No. 1 on the Hot Country Songs charts. "My Own Kind of Hat", "Margaritaville" and "She Just Started Liking Cheatin' Songs" also entered the lower regions of the charts from unsolicited airplay.

Track by track
"Pop a Top": recorded by Jim Ed Brown on his 1967 album Just Jim and was a number three Billboard country single in 1967.
"Farewell Party": recorded by Gene Watson on his 1978 album Reflections and was a number five country single in 1979.
"Kiss an Angel Good Mornin'": recorded by Charley Pride on his 1971 album Charley Pride Sings Heart Songs and was a number one country single in 1971.
"Right in the Palm of Your Hand" was recorded by Mel McDaniel on his 1980 album I'm Countryfied and was a number ten country single in 1981.
"The Blues Man": recorded by Hank Williams, Jr. on his 1980 album Habits Old and New.
"Revenooer Man": recorded by George Jones as the B-side of the 1963 single "I Love You Because".
"My Own Kind of Hat": recorded by Merle Haggard on the 1979 album Serving 190 Proof and became a number four country single in 1979.
"She Just Started Liking Cheatin' Songs": recorded by John Anderson on the 1980 album John Anderson and was a number thirteen country single in 1980.
"The Way I Am": recorded by Merle Haggard on the 1980 album The Way I Am and was a number two country single in 1980.
"It Must Be Love": recorded by Don Williams on the 1978 album Expressions and was a number one country single in 1979.
"Once You've Had the Best": recorded by George Jones on the 1974 album The Grand Tour and was a number three country single in 1973.
"Margaritaville": recorded by Jimmy Buffett on the 1977 album Changes in Latitudes, Changes in Attitudes and reached number eight on the Billboard Hot 100 in 1977.

Track listing

Chart performance
Under the Influence peaked at No. 9 on the U.S. Billboard 200, and peaked at No. 2 on the Top Country Albums. In December 1999, Under the Influence was certified platinum by the RIAA.

Weekly charts

Year-end charts

Sales and Certifications

Personnel
Alan Jackson - lead vocals
Eddie Bayers – drums
Jimmy Buffett – vocals on "Margaritaville"
Stuart Duncan – fiddle, mandolin
Larry Franklin – fiddle
Paul Franklin – steel guitar
Owen Hale – drums
Brent Mason – electric guitar
Gary Prim – piano, keyboard
Michael Rhodes – bass guitar
Hargus "Pig" Robbins – piano, keyboard
Brent Rowan – electric guitar
John Wesley Ryles – backing vocals
Scotty Sanders – steel guitar
Bruce Watkins – acoustic guitar
John Willis – acoustic guitar
Glenn Worf – bass guitar

References

1999 albums
Alan Jackson albums
Arista Records albums
Albums produced by Keith Stegall
Covers albums